The 2018–19 First League of the Federation of Bosnia and Herzegovina was the 24th season of the First League of the Federation of Bosnia and Herzegovina, the second tier league football in Bosnia and Herzegovina, since its original establishment and the 19th as a unified federation-wide league. It began on 11 August 2018 and got concluded on 2 June 2019.

Tuzla City, at that time still known as Sloga Simin Han, were the last champions, having won their first championship title in the 2017–18 season and earning a promotion to the Premier League of Bosnia and Herzegovina.

Teams

League table

Results

Top goalscorers

See also
2018–19 Premier League of Bosnia and Herzegovina
2018–19 First League of the Republika Srpska
2018–19 Bosnia and Herzegovina Football Cup

References

External links
Official site for the Football Federation of Bosnia and Herzegovina
Official site for the Football Federation of the Federation of Bosnia and Herzegovina
2018–19 First League of the Federation of Bosnia and Herzegovina at Soccerway

2
Bos
First League of the Federation of Bosnia and Herzegovina seasons